La Société civile des Auteurs Réalisateurs et Producteurs, acronym L'ARP is France's "Guild of Authors, Directors and Producers." It is a Copyright collective that ensures Collective rights management.

L'ARP co-sponsors City of Lights, City of Angels festival in Los Angeles as well as the VCU French Film Festival in Richmond, Virginia.

References

External links
 L'ARP website (in French)

Copyright collection societies
Entertainment industry unions
Film organizations in France